On December 22, 2014, bombings against civilian locations in two Northern Nigerian cities killed 27 people and injured 60 more. The first happened at a bus station in Gombe, Gombe State, Nigeria. It killed 20 people. The second blast was more powerful and occurred at a market in Bauchi, Bauchi State.

References

2014 murders in Nigeria
Terrorist incidents in Nigeria in 2014
Mass murder in 2014
Gombe State
Improvised explosive device bombings in Nigeria
December 2014 events in Nigeria
Attacks on bus stations

Marketplace attacks in Nigeria
21st-century mass murder in Nigeria
Bauchi State
Improvised explosive device bombings in 2014